Elthorne Park High School (sometimes abbreviated to 'EPHS') is a secondary school located just off Boston Road (the A3002) in Hanwell, a town in the London Borough of Ealing. It provides education for pupils aged from 11 (year 7), until 18 (year 13). Year 13 and Year 12 students are sixth form students.

Developments 
Elthorne became a Maths and Computing specialist school in September 2007, and its Sixth Form opened in September 2009.

It became an authorised IB World School in 2008 and once offered the International Baccalaureate Diploma Programme as its main pre-University course, as well as a variety of applied and vocational courses. However, this came to an end after three years as, despite many successes for the students after the first year, the IB was not proving popular with students and was found to be administratively cumbersome by staff.

In 2012 a decision was made to change the further education course to A-Levels to attract more students. After the decision was made, plans were created to build a new Sixth Form Block. After receiving confirmation from the Council and Local Residents, construction began in late April 2012. Construction was undertaken by Elliot UK. The new block was completed for the term commencing from September 2012/13 and is now in regular use.

As of 2014, Ealing Council announced plans to rebuild "C" block, the largest building in the school, in order to expand the school. The new building was designed by Re-Format LLP. Building began in September 2015 and its original plans were for it to be completed in September 2016 however, due to electrical problems, the block was delayed in opening until Easter 2017.

In early 2017, Clare Balding officially opened the new "C" block in a ceremony. Balding was toured around the school before revealing the plaque in the new hall.

In 2019, Elthorne was officially named an "Outstanding" school by Ofsted.

Catering 
The school is catered for by Pabulum, who specialize in catering for various educational facilities in the UK. Students may purchase a variety of hot and cold foods and drinks at break and lunch using their personal ID cards which connects to their online lunch-money balance. The company faced criticism by some students and parents for its often unhealthy snacks (including hot dogs, pizza and sausage rolls) served at break for additional profit. Some items have since been dropped from break-time service to rectify the concern for students' health and well-being.

Notable Former Pupils 
Chloe Kelly - English Footballer

References

External links 
 EPHS Website
 GCSE League Table - GCSE level performance at Elthorne
 International Baccalaureate
 Save Elthorne - Save Elthorne campaign of 1982-1984

Secondary schools in the London Borough of Ealing
Educational institutions established in 1998
1998 establishments in England
Community schools in the London Borough of Ealing
Hanwell